The Munglinup River is an ephemeral river in the Goldfields-Esperance region of Western Australia.

The headwaters of the river rise near Cheadanup Nature Reserve. For most of the length of the river it is within a vegetated corridor, the surrounding land is mostly cleared for stock with only about 15% remnant vegetation remaining. The river only flows in the winter months and the water is naturally saline or brackish.

The only tributary to the river is Clayhole Creek.

The word Munglinup is Indigenous Australian in origin and of unknown meaning. The name was first recorded by C.D. Price, a surveyor in 1875. The Dempster Brothers first used the name for their sheep station in 1860.

References

Rivers of the Goldfields-Esperance region